William, Will, Bill, or Billy Davies may refer to:

Sportspeople
William Davies (English cricketer) (fl. 1844)
William Davies (cricketer, born 1825) (1825–1868), English cricketer and clergyman
William Davies (footballer, born 1855) (1855–1916), Oswestry F.C. and Wales international footballer
William Davies (sport shooter) (1881–1942), Canadian Olympic sports shooter
William Davies (footballer, born 1882) (1882–1966), Wrexham F.C., Blackburn Rovers F.C. and Wales international footballer
Bill L. Davies (1883–1959), Australian rules footballer
Billy Davies (Welsh footballer) (1883–1960), Crystal Palace F.C., West Bromwich Albion F.C. and Wales international footballer
William Davies (footballer, born 1873) (1873–1929), English footballer for Bolton Wanderers
William Davies (footballer, born 1884) (1884–1954), footballer for Stoke
William Davies (rugby) (1890–1967), Welsh rugby union and rugby league footballer of the 1910s and 1920s
Bill Davies (golfer) (1892–1967), English Ryder Cup golfer
Will Davies (rugby) (fl. 1910s), rugby league footballer for Great Britain, Wales and Halifax
Willie Davies (footballer) (1900–1953), Swansea Town F.C., Cardiff City F.C., Notts County F.C.,Tottenham Hotspur F.C. and Wales international footballer
Bill Davies (cricketer, born 1901) (1901–?), Welsh cricketer
Will Davies (rugby union) (1906–1975), Wales international rugby union player
Bill Davies (cricketer, born 1906) (1906–1971), Welsh cricketer
Taffy Davies (William Davies, 1910–1995), Welsh footballer with Watford
Billy Davies (Welsh rugby) (William H. J. Davies, fl. 1930s), rugby union and rugby league footballer
Bill Davies (Canadian football) (1916–1990), Canadian football player
Willie Davies (1916–2002), Welsh dual-code rugby footballer
Bill Davies (rugby league) (fl. 1940s), rugby league footballer for Wales, and Huddersfield
Bill Davies (footballer) (1930–2003), Australian footballer
William Davies (wrestler) (1931–2020), Australian Olympic wrestler
Billy Davies (cricketer, born 1936), Welsh former cricketer
Tony Davies (William Anthony Davies, 1939–2008), New Zealand rugby union footballer
Billy Davies (rugby league, born 1948) (William Davies), English rugby league footballer
Dai Davies (footballer, born 1948) (William David Davies, 1948–2021), Welsh goalkeeper
Billy Davies (born 1964), Scottish footballer and manager
William Davies (cricketer, born 1972), English cricketer

Politicians
William Davies (Georgia judge) (1775–1829), Georgia-based politician and lawyer
William Davies (Pembrokeshire MP) (1821–1895), British Member of Parliament for Pembrokeshire, 1880–1892
William Davies (New South Wales politician) (1824–1890)
William T. Davies (1831–1912), lieutenant governor of Pennsylvania, United States, 1887–1891
Sir William Howell Davies (1851–1932), British Member of Parliament for Bristol South, 1906–1922
William Thomas Frederick Davies (1860–1947), South African surgeon, army officer and politician
William Rees-Davies (judge) (William Rees Morgan Davies, 1863–1939), British Member of Parliament for Pembrokeshire, 1892–1898
Rupert Davies (politician) (William Rupert Davies, 1879–1967), Canadian author, newspaper publisher and Senator
Billy Davies (politician) (1884–1956), Welsh-born Australian member of the New South Wales Legislative Assembly and the Australian Parliament
William Gwynne Davies (1916–1999), trade unionist and politician in Saskatchewan, Canada

Other people
William Davies (priest) (died 1593), Welsh Roman Catholic priest and martyr
William Davies (highwayman) (died 1689), known as the Golden Farmer and hanged in Surrey, England
William Davies (Virginia) (fl. 1770s), Continental Army officer in the American Revolutionary War
William Davies (died 1819), English publisher with Cadell & Davies
William Davies (palaeontologist) (1814–1891), British palaeontologist
William Edmund Davies (1819–1879), bookmaker
William Broughton Davies (1831–1906), Sierra Leonean medical doctor
William Henry Davies (entrepreneur) (1831–1921), Canadian pork packer
William W. Davies (1833–1906), leader of a schismatic Latter Day Saint group in Washington, United States
William Davies (master mariner) (1862–1936), sea captain and partner in Davies and Newman
W. H. Davies (William Henry Davies, 1871–1940), Welsh poet
William Llewelyn Davies (1887–1952), chief librarian of the National Library of Wales, Aberystwyth
William David Davies (1897–1969), Welsh Presbyterian minister and theologian
William J. Davies (fl. 1900–1927), Welsh trade union leader
William W. Davies (USMC) (1900–1985), United States Marine Corps general
Sir William Arthian Davies (1901–1979), British lawyer and judge
William Edward Davies (1917–1990), American geologist and caver
William H. Davies (1931–2017), justice of the Supreme Court of British Columbia
William Davies (psychologist) (born 1950), British psychologist
William Davies (screenwriter) (fl. 1980s–2010s), British-born American screenwriter
William Davies (political writer) (born 1976), English writer, political and sociological theorist
Bill Davies (died 2016), English real estate developer, owner of Old Chicago Main Post Office

Characters
Will Davies (Hollyoaks), a character on Hollyoaks
Billy Davies (River City), a character on River City

Other uses
William Davies Company, former Canadian pork packing firm

See also
William Richardson Davie (1756–1820), governor of North Carolina
William Davis (disambiguation)
William Davies Evans (1790–1872), seafarer, inventor, and chess player
William Rees-Davies (disambiguation)
William Davies Thomas (1889–1954), professor of English at Saskatchewan and Swansea